The New Haven Rowing Club is a private, non-profit, rowing club on the Housatonic River in Oxford, Connecticut, United States of America.  Founded in 1970 by Tony Johnson, Yale University Rowing coach, to allow him to continue training his athletes throughout the summer.  Late in 1970, several of the "old-timers" began to show up at the Yale boathouse in Derby, CT, and thus began the Masters program of the New Haven Rowing Club .

New Haven Rowing Club used the Yale University Boathouse until 1991, when Yale needed more space and New Haven Rowing Club was also looking to increase its size.  In 1992 land was acquired four miles north of the Yale boathouse, just over the Oxford Town line, on the Housatonic River.  Over the next two years the boathouse was built by its members using a design by architect and fellow member Stuart Lathers.

New Haven Rowing Club hosts two annual regattas, the Derby Sweeps and Sculls and the Head of the Housatonic.  Derby Sweeps and Sculls is a sprint race along a straight 1000 meter long course that is held in June. It runs upstream (north) and finishes at the southern end of Indian Well State Park.  Head of the Housatonic is a 2.3 mile head race held in October. It starts south of Indian Well State Park and finishes at the New Haven Rowing Club Boathouse.

References

External links
New Haven Rowing Club webpage
Head of the Housatonic webpage
Stuart Lathers Associates, LLC: Designer of the Boathouse

Rowing clubs in the United States
Boathouses in the United States
1970 establishments in Connecticut